Hoi Sham Island, also called To Kwa Wan Island, was an island in Kowloon Bay off the coast of To Kwa Wan, Kowloon Peninsula in Hong Kong. It was connected to the mainland as a consequence of land reclamation, and it is now part of Hoi Sham Park.

History
The island was known by the locals for its distinctive shape of the rocks, some of them were given names, such as Hoi Sham Rock and Fishtail Rock, and the island was believed to be a place of good feng shui. A Lung Mo Temple, also called Hoi Sham Temple, was originally built on the island at the foot of the rock.

Upon reclamation of the bay of To Kwa Wan in the 1960s, the island was connected to the urban To Kwa Wan area, and was converted into Hoi Sham Park in 1972. The Fishtail Rock and Hoi Sham Rock were preserved and are displayed in the park.

The temple was demolished in 1964 and the statue of Lung Mo was relocated to the nearby Tin Hau Temple, built in 1885 and located at the corner of Ha Heung Road and Lok Shan Road. In this temple, the statue of the Lung Mo is on the altar of the left bay (right side when viewed from the front).

See also
 List of islands and peninsulas of Hong Kong

References

External links

Photo gallery of the park
Historical images of the island: 

To Kwa Wan
Urban public parks and gardens in Hong Kong